Worry is anxiety or concern about a real or imagined issue.

Worry may also refer to:

 Worry, North Carolina, an unincorporated community in Burke County, North Carolina, United States
 Worry (album), a 2016 album by Jeff Rosenstock
 "Worry" (song), a 2017 song by Mileo
 Worry (short film), a nominee for the AACTA Award for Best Short Animation in 1987

See also
 Don't Worry (disambiguation)
 No worries (disambiguation)